This is a list of diseases of foliage plants belonging to the family Polypodiaceae.

Plant Species

Bacterial diseases

Fungal diseases

Nematodes, parasitic

References
Common Names of Diseases, The American Phytopathological Society

Foliage plant (Polypodiaceae)